Michael Schmidt-Ruthenbeck (born 1942) is a German billionaire businessman, together with his brother Rainer, owner of 16% of the retail group Metro AG.

Early life
He is the son of Wilhelm Schmidt-Ruthenbeck and Vera Ruthenbeck. His brother is Rainer Schmidt-Ruthenbeck and his sister is Viola Schmidt-Ruthenbeck.

Career
On the Forbes 2016 list of the world's billionaires, he and his brother were ranked #722 with a net worth of US$2.4 billion.

Personal life
He lives in Duisburg, Germany.

References

1942 births
Living people
Businesspeople from North Rhine-Westphalia
20th-century German businesspeople
21st-century German businesspeople
German businesspeople in retailing
German billionaires
Metro Group people
People from Duisburg